Women and Soldiers (Italian: Donne e soldati) is a 1954 Italian historical adventure film directed by Luigi Malerba and Antonio Marchi and starring Marcella Mariani, Sandro Somarè and Marco Ferreri. It is set during the Medieval era during a siege of a city in Emilia. Location shooting took place at Montechiarugolo and Torrechiara.

Cast
 Marcella Mariani as Margherita 
 Sandro Somarè as Storyteller 
 Marco Ferreri as Landlord 
 Gaia Servadio
 Anna Albertelli
 Enrico Magretti

References

Bibliography 
 Chiti, Roberto & Poppi, Roberto. Dizionario del cinema italiano: Dal 1945 al 1959. Gremese Editore, 1991.

External links 
 

1954 films
Italian historical adventure films
1950s historical adventure films
1950s Italian-language films
Italian black-and-white films
1950s Italian films